Choi Gi-Bong (최기봉, born November 13, 1958) is a South Korean former footballer.

He played in the K-League for the Yukong Elephants

Honours
 K-League Best XI (1) : 1987

External links
 

1958 births
Living people
Association football forwards
South Korean footballers
South Korea international footballers
Jeju United FC players
FC Seoul non-playing staff
Association football scouts